Qin Wangping (born 16 June 1982 in Nantong, Jiangsu province) is a Chinese sprinter who specialized in the 100 metres. Her personal best time is 11.30 seconds, achieved in June 2000 in Jinzhou.

Qin represented China at the 2008 Summer Olympics in Beijing competing at the 4x100 metres relay together with Wang Jing, Jiang Lan and Tao Yujia. In their first round heat they placed fourth behind Jamaica, Russia and Germany. Their time of 43.78 seconds was the tenth time overall out of sixteen participating nations. With this result they failed to qualify for the final.

International competitions

References

1982 births
Living people
Chinese female sprinters
Athletes (track and field) at the 2000 Summer Olympics
Athletes (track and field) at the 2008 Summer Olympics
Olympic athletes of China
Asian Games medalists in athletics (track and field)
Athletes (track and field) at the 2002 Asian Games
Athletes (track and field) at the 2006 Asian Games
Universiade medalists in athletics (track and field)
Asian Games gold medalists for China
Asian Games bronze medalists for China
Medalists at the 2002 Asian Games
Medalists at the 2006 Asian Games
Universiade gold medalists for China
Sportspeople from Nantong
Runners from Jiangsu
Medalists at the 2003 Summer Universiade
Olympic female sprinters
21st-century Chinese women